Hemel Hempstead is a town in the Dacorum district in Hertfordshire, England. The population at the 2011 census was 97,500.

Developed after the Second World War as a new town, it has existed since the 8th century and was granted its town charter by Henry VIII in 1539. Nearby towns are Watford, St Albans and Berkhamsted.

History

Origin of the name
The settlement was called by the name Henamsted or Hean-Hempsted in Anglo-Saxon times and in William the Conqueror's time by the name of Hemel-Amstede. The name is referred to in the Domesday Book as Hamelamestede, but in later centuries it became Hamelhamsted, and, possibly, Hemlamstede.  In Old English, -stead or -stede simply meant "place"  (reflected in German Stadt and Dutch stede or stad, meaning "city" or "town"), such as the site of a building or pasture, as in clearing in the woods, and this suffix is used in the names of other English places such as Hamstead and Berkhamsted.

It is theoretically possible for a previous name to have become corrupted to something very similar to Hempstead, and that Hemel originated as a way of specifying Hemel Hempstead as opposed to nearby Berkhamsted. Hemel is reflected in the German Himmel and Dutch Hemel, both of which mean 'heaven' or 'sky', so it could be that Hemel Hempstead was in a less forested area open to the sky, while Berkhamsted (which could mean 'birch', reflected in the Dutch berk) was in a forest of birch trees.

Another opinion is that Hemel came from Haemele, the name of the district in the 8th century, and is most likely either the name of the landowner or meant "broken country".

The town is now known to locals as Hemel. However, before the Second World War locals called it Hempstead. Emigrants from Hemel Hempstead, led by one John Carman, migrated to the American colonies in the early 17th century and founded the town of Hempstead, New York in 1644.

Early history

The first recorded mention of the town is the grant of land at Hamaele by Offa, King of Essex, to the Saxon Bishop of London in AD 705. Hemel Hempstead on its present site is mentioned in the Domesday Book of 1086 as a vill, Hamelhamstede, with about 100 inhabitants. The parish church of St Mary's was built in 1140, and is recognised as one of the finest Norman parish churches in the county. The church features an unusual  spire, added in the 12th century, one of Europe's tallest.

After the Norman conquest, Robert, Count of Mortain, the elder half-brother of William the Conqueror, was granted lands associated with Berkhamsted Castle which included Hemel Hempstead. The estates passed through several hands over the next few centuries including Thomas Becket in 1162. Hemel Hempstead was in the Domesday hundred of Danais (Daneys, i.e. Danish) which by 1200 had been combined with the hundred of Tring to form the hundred of Dacorum, which maintained its court into the 19th century. In 1290 King John's grandson, the Earl of Cornwall, gave the manor to the religious order of the Bonhommes when he endowed the monastery at Ashridge.

The town remained part of the monastery's estates until the Reformation and break-up of Ashridge in 1539. In that same year, the town was granted a royal charter by Henry VIII to become a bailiwick with the right to hold a Thursday market and a fair on Corpus Christi Day. The first bailiff of Hemel Hempstead was William Stephyns (29 December 1539). Henry VIII and Anne Boleyn are reputed to have stayed in the town at this time.

In 1953 a collection of unusually fine medieval wall paintings dating between 1470 and 1500 were discovered in a cottage in Piccotts End, a village on the outskirts of Hemel Hempstead. This same building had been converted into the first cottage hospital providing free medical services by Sir Astley Cooper in 1827.

In 1581, a group of local people acquired lands – now referred to as Boxmoor – from the Earl of Leicester to prevent their enclosure. These were transferred to trustees in 1594. These have been used for public grazing and they are administered by the Box Moor Trust.

Remains of Roman villa farming settlements have been found at Boxmoor and Gadebridge which span the entire period of Roman Britain. A well preserved Roman burial mound is located in Adeyfield.

18th to mid-20th century

In the 18th and 19th centuries, Hemel Hempstead was an agricultural market town. Wealthy landowners built a few large country houses in the locality, including The Bury, built in 1790, and Gadebridge House, erected by the noted surgeon and anatomist Sir Astley Cooper in 1811.

As the Industrial Revolution gained momentum, commercial travel between the Midlands and London increased greatly. Hemel Hempstead was located on a direct route between these areas of industry and commerce and this made it a natural waypoint for trade and travel between the two. Initially the Sparrows Herne Turnpike Road was opened in 1762.

In 1793 construction began on the Grand Junction Canal, a major project to provide a freight waterway between the Midlands and the Port of London. In 1798, the canal from the Thames reached Two Waters, just south of Hemel Hempstead, and opened fully in 1805.

Hemel's position on the commercial transport network was established further in 1837 when the route of the new London and Birmingham Railway reached the town. The line's construction had been delayed for several years by vigorous lobbying by a number of powerful local landowners, including Sir Astley Cooper of Gadebridge House, who were all keen to protect their estates from invasion by the "iron horse". Their campaign was successful and the main line was routed along the River Bulbourne instead of the River Gade, skirting around the edge of Hemel Hempstead. As a result, the railway station serving Hemel Hempstead was built one mile outside the town centre at Boxmoor; Boxmoor and Hemel Hempstead railway station (today's Hemel Hempstead railway station) opened in 1837. A new Hemel Hempstead Hospital was established at the bottom of Hillfield Road in 1832.

Despite the incursion of various forms of transport, Hemel remained principally an agricultural market town throughout the 19th century. In the last decades of that century development of houses and villas for London commuters began. Hemel steadily expanded, but only became a borough, with its headquarters at the old town hall on 13 July 1898.

During the Second World War ninety high explosive bombs were dropped on the town by the Luftwaffe. The most notorious incident was on 10 May 1942 when a stick of bombs demolished houses at Nash Mills killing eight people. The nearby John Dickinson & Co. factories which were used to produce munitions, were the target.

New town

After the Second World War, in 1946, the government designated Hemel Hempstead as the site of one of its proposed new towns designed to house the population displaced by the London Blitz, since slums and bombsites were being cleared in London. On 4 February 1947, the Government purchased  of land and began work on the "New Town". The first new residents moved in during April 1949, and the town continued its planned expansion through to the end of the 1980s. Hemel grew to its present population of 97,500, with new developments enveloping the original town on all sides. The original part of Hemel is still known as the "Old Town".

Hemel Hempstead was announced as candidate No 3 for a New Town in July 1946, in accordance with the government's "policy for the decentralisation of persons and industry from London". Initially there was much resistance and hostility to the plan from locals, especially when it was revealed that any development would be carried out not by the local council but by a newly appointed government body, the Hemel Hempstead Development Corporation (later amalgamated with similar bodies to form the Commission for New Towns). However, following a public inquiry the following year, the town got the go-ahead. Hemel officially became a New Town on 4 February 1947.

The initial plans for the New Town were drawn up by architect Geoffrey Jellicoe. His view of Hemel Hempstead, he said, was "not a city in a garden, but a city in a park." However, the plans were not well received by most locals. Revised, and less radical plans were drawn up, and the first developments proceeded despite local protests in July 1948. The first area to be developed was Adeyfield. At this time the plans for a revolutionary double roundabout at Moor End were first put forward, but in fact it was not until 1973 that the roundabout was opened as it was originally designed. (It was quickly christened 'The Magic Roundabout' by locals, echoing the name of the children's TV show.) The first houses erected as part of the New Town plan were in Longlands, Adeyfield, and went up in the spring of 1949. The first new residents moved into their new houses in February 1950.

At this time, work started on building new factories and industrial areas, to avoid the town becoming a dormitory town. The first factory was erected in 1950 in Maylands Avenue. As building progressed with continuing local opposition, the town was becoming increasingly popular with those moving in from areas of north London. By the end of 1951, there was a waiting list of about 10,000 wishing to move to Hemel. The neighbourhoods of Bennett's End, Chaulden and Warner's End were started. The Queen paid a visit shortly after her accession in 1952, and laid a foundation stone for a new church in Adeyfield – one of her first public engagements as Queen. The shopping square she visited is named Queen's Square, and the nearby area has street names commemorating the then-recent conquest of Everest, such as Hillary and Tenzing Roads. This conquest is also celebrated in the name of a pub in Warners End – the "Top of the World".

The redevelopment of the town centre was started in 1952, with a new centre based on Marlowes south of the old town. This was alongside a green area called the Water Gardens, designed by Jellicoe, formed by ponding back the River Gade. The old centre of the High Street was to remain largely undeveloped, though the market square closed and was replaced by a much larger one in the new centre. The former private estate of Gadebridge was opened up as a public park. New schools and roads were built to serve the expanding new neighbourhoods. New housing technology such as prefabrication started to be used from the mid-'50s, and house building rates increased dramatically. Highfield was the next neighbourhood to be constructed. The M1 motorway opened to the east in 1959, and a new road connecting it to the town was opened.

By 1962, the redevelopment of the new town as originally envisaged was largely complete, though further expansion plans were then put forward. The nearby United States Air Force base of Bovingdon, which had served as the town's 'de facto' airport, reverted to RAF use at this time, continuing as an active military airfield until 1971. A campus of West Herts College, the library, new police station and the Pavilion (theatre and music venue) were all built during the 1960s. The town seemed to attract its fair share of celebrity openings, with shops and businesses opened by Frankie Vaughan, Benny Hill, Terry-Thomas, and the new cinema was opened by Hollywood star Lauren Bacall. The last of the originally-planned neighbourhoods, Grovehill, began construction in 1967. However, further neighbourhoods of Woodhall Farm and Fields End were later built as part of the extended plans.

Like other first generation new towns, Hemel is divided into residential neighbourhoods, each with their own "village centre" with shops, pubs and services. Each neighbourhood is designed around a few major feeder roads with many smaller cul-de-sacs and crescents, intended to minimise traffic and noise nuisance. In keeping with the optimism of the early post-war years, much of the town features modernist architecture with many unusual and experimental designs for housing. Not all of these have stood the test of time.  A significant issue was how to choose names for all the new roads. Many areas of the new town used themes e.g. fields, birds, rivers, poets, explorers, leaders, etc.

In 1974, the government abolished the Borough of Hemel Hempstead and the town was incorporated into Dacorum District, along with Tring and Berkhamsted. The first chairman of that council was chairman John Johnson (1913–1977). In the 1980s, Dacorum District Council successfully lobbied to be recognised as the successor for the Royal Charter establishing the Borough of Hemel Hempstead and thus regained the Mayor and its Aldermen and became Dacorum Borough.

Geography

The New Town expansion took place up the valley sides and onto the plateau above the original Old Town.

To the north and west lie mixed farm and woodland with scattered villages, part of the Chiltern Hills. To the west lies Berkhamsted. The River Bulbourne flows along the south-western edge of the town through Boxmoor. To the south lie Watford and the beginnings of the Greater London conurbation. To the east lies St Albans, a cathedral city and also like Hemel Hempstead, is part of the London commuter belt.

Districts

The grand design for Hemel Hempstead new town saw each new district centred around a parade or square of shops called a neighbourhood centre. Other districts existed before the new town as suburbs, villages and industrial centres, and were incorporated into the town.

Adeyfield – Located on a hill to the east of the Old Town, this was the first of the New Town districts to be started. The first four families of Hemel Hempstead's new town moved into their homes in Adeyfield on Wednesday, 8 February 1950.
Apsley – a 19th-century mill town a mile south of Old Hemel which grew up around the paper making industry – notably the John Dickinson & Co. mills. Now a suburb of Hemel with many warehouse outlets set in retail parks, a large office facility for Hertfordshire County Council and a large Sainsbury's supermarket.
Bennetts End – Located on the rising ground to the south east and another original district of the new town. Construction began in 1951 and by autumn 1952, 300 houses were occupied.
Boxmoor – A mostly Victorian era developed district to the southwest which grew up because it was near the LMS station and trains to London.
 Chaulden – an early new town district, west of the town, commenced in 1953 with its own neighbourhood shopping centre.
 Corner Hall – an estate adjacent to the Plough Roundabout frequently thought to be part of Apsley. Bounded by Lawn Lane and St Albans Hill.
 Cupid Green – an industrial area estate north east of the town and home to its recycling centre.
Felden – Felden is a partly rural area south west of Hemel Hempstead that has many wealthy detached houses. It is home to the national headquarters of the Boys' Brigade.
Gadebridge – A later 1960s development located north west of the old town around the Rossgate shopping parade.
Grovehill – a housing estate towards the northern edge of Hemel Hempstead. It was developed as part of the second wave of development of the New Town commencing in 1967 and completed in stages by the early 1980s. Within the estate is Henry Wells Square, containing local shops, an off licence and a pub. The estate also contains Grovehill Community Centre, and Grovehill Playing Fields, home to many football pitches, a baseball ground and changing facilities. Grovehill also incorporates various churches, a doctor's surgery and a dental surgery as well as several schools including The Astley Cooper School.
Highfield – a district of the original new town located north of the old town.
Leverstock Green – A village 2½ miles east of the old town which pre-existed the new town and which has now been subsumed into it, although retaining its original village centre. It was once a popular place for actors and artists to live.
Maylands –  The industrial zone of the new town from its inception, located to the east. It was originally called the Maylands factory estate but was rebranded as the Maylands Business Park in 2013.
Nash Mills – a historic name for a district beside the River Gade downstream and southeast of the town which had water mills since at least the 11th century. It is now a mix of industrial use and housing from the 19th century through to small modern developments.
Warner's End – an original new town residential district on chalk upland to the west of Hemel Hempstead where work commenced in 1953.
Woodhall Farm – A housing estate on the north eastern edge of town towards Redbourn. Woodhall Farm was built in the mid to late 1970s on the former Brocks Fireworks site with a mix of private and housing association stock. Built by Fairview Estates it has property ranging from four-bedroom detached houses down to one bedroom low-rise flats. The area has a shopping centre. It also has two infant schools and middle schools and a doctor's surgery.

Developments since the new town

Jarman Park 
Jarman Park, the central location for leisure in the town, was previously agricultural land, which later becomes fields named after former town councilor and mayor, Henry Jarman, who oversaw the development of the New Town. The developments were built on land originally donated to the town for recreational purposes. Replacement open space was created to the east of the town, near Leverstock Green, Longdean Park and Nash Mills.

The first phase of recreational facilities, which opened in 1978, was the Loco Motion Skate Park. Subsequently, it became a dry ski slope with a small nursery slope next to it. Both areas were removed to make way for the Snow Centre which opened in 2009. A Tesco superstore was built in 1994 along with a petrol station, which was later expanded into a Tesco Extra. It was the first to be built with natural light let in. The Jarman Leisure Centre complex opened on 25 August 1995, originally managed by The Rank Organisation until 2007 and currently managed by the Tesco Pension Fund. The current 17 screen Cineworld is its flagship attraction, In addition to the cinema there is an ice rink, several restaurants and a gym.

When it was opened as Leisure World at a cost of £22 million, the cinema originally featured 8 screens and was operated by Odeon Cinemas, and later managed by Empire Cinemas until August 2016. The complex also included the upstairs Toddlerworld play area, the Aquasplash water park, Hotshots, which was a 30 lane ten pin bowling facility with a bar, Jarman Park Bowls Club, which was an upstairs bowls facility with 7 rinks, restaurants, a large arcade in the middle of the building, snooker and pool tables, a discothèque called Visage, later named Lava, a nightclub and a themed bar.

In December 2011, plans were submitted by the then landlords Capital & Regional to redevelop the site. It proposed a collection of family friendly cafes & restaurants, with Aquasplash closing down.

The cinema continued to operate while the ice rink went under refurbishment. The cinema was expanded from 8 screens to 17 with one large 281 IMAX auditorium.

There is also an athletics track nearby that opened in 1996 which is managed by the sports group Sportspace, with a small children's play park next to it. The track is used by local schools for sports days.

The most recent facilities, which opened in July 2011, is an extreme sports centre called the XC, which contains a skate park, caving, climbing walls, high ropes, a café and counselling rooms for young people. It is co-run by Youth Connexions and Sportspace.

Apsley Mills 
The former John Dickinson & Co. mills site, straddling the canal at Apsley, was redeveloped with two retail parks, a Sainsbury's supermarket, 3 low rise office blocks, housing, a mooring basin and a hotel. A further office block was also built. Some buildings have been retained for their historic interest and to provide a home for the Apsley Paper Museum.

The now disused mill site at Nash Mills was also redeveloped to build housing and community facilities, it retains some historic buildings.

Marlowes and the Old Town 
An indoor shopping mall was developed adjacent to the south end of the Marlowe's retail area in 1990, and in 2005 the Riverside development designed by Bernard Engle Architects was opened, effectively extending the main shopping precinct towards the Plough Roundabout. The new centre includes several outlets for national retailers including Debenhams, Starbucks, Waterstones and others. These two developments have moved the ’centre of gravity’ of the retail centre away from the north end of Marlowe's has become an area for secondary outlets. Further extensive redevelopment of the northern end of Marlowes was also given the green light in 2007 and has now been completed.

In late 2014, the council began to improve the original newtown centre's appearance. The Old Town was refurbished with new paving, signage, and landscaping. The old council buildings and library have closed down,  replaced with a new development named "The Forum" which opened in early 2017, where Dacorum Borough Council, the new library, Hertfordshire Police's Safer Neighbourhood Team, the Hertfordshire Registration and Citizenship Service, Dacorum Community Trust, Mediation Dacorum, Relate and the Citizen's Advice Bureau are all located. 200 new homes will surround this new development. There will be a riverside walk/cycle way. The abandoned Market Square is set to be more leisure facilities.

The Jellicoe Water Gardens have been restored, clearing up the overgrown trees, introducing a new play area, an area for picnics and gardening, a community centre for volunteers, learning organisations and schools, as well as the Friends of the Jellicoe Water Gardens and a new terrace for the flower garden.

The pedestrianized high street was redeveloped, with a new play area and new play equipment around the street, such as giant coloured balls, slides, a tightrope and trampolines with the old sculpture placed on top of a new pillar detailing the work of Geoffrey Jellicoe.

Isle of Man-based residential developer Dandara redeveloped the old Kodak headquarters into a block of flats, with a new footbridge to the Riverside shopping precinct..

Maylands 
Since the 2005 Buncefield fire the former Maylands Avenue factory estate, which was badly affected by the fire, has been rebranded as Maylands Business Park and a 40-tonne sculpture by Jose Zavala called Phoenix Gateway placed on the first roundabout off the M1 to symbolise its renewal. A number of businesses have since located into the Maylands area including Costa Coffee, Lok'nStore and McDonald's.

Major planned developments

East Hemel 
St Albans District council has plans to meet its new homes building target by building on land to the east of Hemel Hempstead near the M1 motorway. This would comprise 2,500 new homes. The land is within St Albans planning jurisdiction but would have a major impact on Hemel services which has been quite controversial.

West Hemel 
Land to the west of Chaulden and Warners End has been removed from the Green Belt designation and is due for development with 900 new homes.

Commerce, industry and agriculture

Historical

Historically, the area was agricultural and was noted for its rich cereal production. The agricultural journalist William Cobbett noted of Hemel Hempstead in 1822 that "..the land along here is very fine: a red tenacious flinty loam upon a bed of chalk at a yard or two beneath, which, in my opinion, is the very best corn land that we have in England." By the 18th century the grain market in Hemel was one of the largest in the country. In 1797 there were 11 watermills working in the vicinity of the town.

The chalk on which Hemel is largely built has had commercial value and has been mined and exploited to improve farmland and for building from the 18th century. In the Highbarns area, now residential, there was a collapse in 2007 of a section of old chalk workings and geological studies have been undertaken to show the extent of these workings.

In the 19th century, Hemel Hempstead was a noted brickmaking, paper manufacturing and straw-plaiting centre. In later 19th and early 20th centuries, Hemel was also a noted watercress growing area, supplying 1/16 of the country's national demand – following development of the New Town, the watercress growing moved to nearby Berkhamsted and Tring. The cress beds were redeveloped as the modern-day Water Gardens.

Joseph Cranstone's engineering company was founded in 1798, and was responsible for much of the early street lighting in the town as well as it first gasworks. It became the Hemel Hempstead Engineering Company and stayed in business until the Second World War. In 1867 Cranstone's son built a steam powered coach which he drove to London, but which was destroyed in a crash on the return journey. A local Boxmoor pub commemorates the event.

In 1803 the first automatic papermaking machinery was developed in Hemel by the Fourdrinier brothers at Frogmore. Paper making expanded in the vicinity in the early 19th century and grew into the huge John Dickinson & Co. mills in the 20th.

A traditional employer in the area was also Brock's, manufacturer of fireworks. The factory was a significant employer since well before the Second World War, and remained in production until the mid-1970s. The present-day neighbourhood of Woodhall Farm was subsequently built on the site.

From 1967 to 1983, it was home to one of the most remarkable newspaper experiments of recent times, when the Thomson Organisation launched the Hemel Hempstead Evening Post-Echo. This comprised two evening papers – the Evening Echo and the Evening Post – and was based at a modern headquarters in Mark Road which had previously been used as a hot water bottle factory. The dual operation was conceived by Lord Thomson of Fleet to take on the Northcliffe and Beaverbrook domination of the London evening paper market and tap into what he saw as a major source of consumer advertising.

The papers were remarkable not only for technological innovation but also journalistic excellence. Both the Evening Echo and Evening Post won design awards during the late 1960s and early 1970s, but it was the Evening Echo that took the major writing honours, with John Marquis being voted Provincial Journalist of the Year in 1974 and Melanie Phillips being named Young Journalist of the Year in 1975.

Many outstanding journalists worked on both papers during their heyday, with several going on to be editors and leading Fleet Street figures. Unfortunately, the operation fell victim to the freesheet revolution of the 1980s, the titles closing in 1983 with the loss of 470 jobs.

Significant historic local firms include:

 Addressograph, address labels and labelling systems
 Apple's UK operations were originally based in Hemel, though they moved to much larger premises in Uxbridge during the late 1980s.
 BP
 Brocks Fireworks, firework manufacturer
 Crosfield Electronics – digital imaging systems, now part of FFEI Ltd.
 Hemel Hempstead Evening Post-Echo, then part of Thomson Regional Newspapers and one of the few nightly regional newspapers
 John Dickinson & Co., paper manufacturing
 Kodak
 Lucas Aerospace – moved (as TRW Aeronautical Systems) to Pitstone in 2002.
 Parker Hannifin

Present day

Hemel Hempstead has a mixture of heavy and light engineering companies and has attracted a significant number of information technology and telecommunications sector companies helped by its proximity to London and the UK motorway network. However, (and again in common with many new towns) it has a much narrower business base than established centres, particularly Watford and St Albans.

Significant firms with a local presence include:

 Apricot Computers (formerly ACT)
 Amazon.com has a distribution warehouse on the Maylands Business Park
 Aquascutum, clothing manufacturer
 Atlas Copco, UK head office of Swedish industrial company
 AXIA, web based clothing retailer
 ASOS.com, Customer Care department of UK's largest online fashion retailer
 Blackhawk Network Holdings, gift card and payment company
 Bourne Leisure
 BP Oil, petroleum
 BSI Product Services
 British Telecom, telecommunications
 BSI (British Standards Institution) materials testing
 Britvic, producer of soft drinks
 DBD Distribution Ltd, kitchen appliances
 DuPont, petrochemicals
 Epson, consumer electronics
 Friedheim International Ltd, supplier of finishing, converting and packaging machinery
 Henkel, UK and Ireland headquarters of the German chemical and consumer goods company
 Aon Hewitt, human resources (personnel) out-sourcing and benefits administration consulting arm of Aon
 Kent Brushes (G B Kent & Sons Ltd), established in 1777 & has been manufacturing brushes in Apsley for most of that time.
 Kodak, photography – (formerly in central Hemel, now located on 3Com Campus)
 NEXT, clothing (distribution centre)
 Northgate Information Solutions, specialist software for human resources
Royal Mail, Home Counties North Delivery Office
Screwfix, trade tools, accessories and hardware products
Sopra Steria computers, IT services
 Thermo Fisher Scientific Chromatography and Mass Spectrometry business
 Unisys, computers
 Xerox Office Supplies, document supplies, paper development
 UTC Aerospace Systems, Aerospace equipment
Vitabiotics, corporate office of the UK's largest nutraceutical company

Transport

In 1798, the construction of the Grand Junction Canal reached Hemel Hempstead. Now part of the Grand Union Canal, it is a popular route for narrowboat pleasure craft and is maintained by the Canal & River Trust.

It is on the West Coast Main Line and there are frequent services between London Euston and the Midlands, operated by London Northwestern Railway, with additional direct services to  via the West London Line operated by Southern.

This station closed to passenger services in 1947, along with the line, and it was demolished in 1969.

Hemel Hempstead bus station is situated in Waterhouse Street. In 2013, Dacorum Council announced that the bus station would be demolished and replaced with a new bus interchange next to the Marlowes Shopping Centre on Bridge Street. The project was completed in September 2014.

In the 1990s, the A41 dual carriageway was built with a link to the town across the upland chalk plateau. Hemel Hempstead is linked to the M1 motorway to the east and the M25 motorway to the south.

Sport

Hemel Hempstead Town Football Club dates back to 1885 and now play in the National League South. Nicknamed The Tudors, they play at Vauxhall Road in the Adeyfield area of the town; this was the site of the former sports club for the employees of Brocks Fireworks. There are also many amateur sides throughout the town.

In rugby league, Hemel Stags, founded in 1981, were admitted to the third tier RFL League 1 in the 2013 season however in 2019 the club was purchased by a Canadian consortium and relocated to Ottawa being readmitted to the league for the 2021 season under the name Ottawa Aces.

Camelot Rugby Club is a rugby union club founded in 1919 and play in London 2 North West, a seventh tier league in the English rugby union league system. The club's home ground is at Chaulden Lane, Chaulden.

Hemel Storm are a basketball team that compete in the second tier English Basketball League Division 1. They play their home games at Sportspace.

Herts Baseball Club has been based in Grovehill since 1997. It has two purpose-built baseball diamonds, with permanent fencing. Herts is one of the biggest clubs in the country and has won national titles at both adult and junior level.

Hemel Hempstead Town Cricket Club, founded in 1850, has a pitch and practice facilities at Heath Park, near the town centre. The Boxmoor Cricket Club, founded in 1857, have a ground nearby on Blackbirds Moor. At Leverstock Green, there is the eponymously named Leverstock Green Cricket Club.

A large multiple roomed indoor laser tag arena called Quasar has been located in the Marlowes since 1994.

Hemel Hempstead has an indoor snow centre, a real snow indoor sports venue which, opened in April 2009, and offers a range of indoor snow based sports and activities.

Dacorum & Tring Athletic Club is based at Jarman Park. Hemel Hempstead Bowls Club has its greens at Gadebridge Park.

Gadebridge Park also has an outdoor skatepark that was designed and supplied by local extreme sports fanatics ‘Hemel Skates’ after earning £65,000 through fundraising.

Leverstock Green Tennis Club provides courts and coaching for members and other courts are available in public parks. There are private indoor facilities at Hemel Indoor Tennis Centre at Abbot's Hill School, Nash Mills.

The local authority (Dacorum Borough Council) provides the infrastructure for several of the sports mentioned above. In addition, there is a sports centre at Boxmoor and shared public facilities at a number of secondary schools, provided via Sportspace. These provide multi-purpose courts (badminton, basketball, etc.), gymnasia and swimming pools. There are also private, 'members only' gymnasia.

There are two 18-hole golf courses just outside the south western edge of the town. One is in the grounds of Shendish Manor and the other, Little Hay is off Box Lane, on Box Moor Trust land. There was also a 9-hole course (Boxmoor) also located on Box Lane. This closed in July 2011, and is now a nature reserve being part of the Boxmoor Trust estate.

Wildcards Roller Hockey Club was established in 1996 and is a non-profit making organisation run by volunteers to enable people to play Inline Hockey in Hertfordshire.

Jarman Park had a ten pin bowling alley, ice skating, and a swimming pool with slides until they closed at the end of 2013. The only 2 facilities left in Jarman Park are the XC an extreme sport centre with indoor skate boarding, rock climbing, bowls and potholing facilities. Close to Jarman Park is the Snow Centre, the UK's largest indoor ski slope.

Hemel Hempstead has several swimming clubs the most notable of which is Hemel Hempstead Swimming Club, the town also has FIFOLITS Swimming club and also boasts a swimming squad Dacorum Borough Swimming Squad which brings together the best swimmers in the borough.

Competitive cycling events such as the Tour of Britain and The Women's Tour often include Hemel as a stage.

Schools

There are seven state maintained secondary schools in the town:
Adeyfield Academy – a business and enterprise college
The Astley Cooper School – a specialist college for the visual arts
Laureate Academy –  a part of Future Academies, a multi-academy trust. Formerly known as the Cavendish School until 2019.
Hemel Hempstead School – a specialist performing arts, maths & science school
John F. Kennedy Catholic School – a specialist technology and modern foreign languages college (Roman Catholic)
Longdean School – a maths and computing academy

There are also three independent (fee-paying) schools in, or adjacent, to the town:
Abbot's Hill School – a day and boarding school for girls
Lockers Park School – a day and boarding school for boys aged 5–13
Westbrook Hay School – a co-educational school for children aged 3–13
In addition there is a West Herts College Campus based in the town centre.

In 2006, the local education authority judged that there are too many primary school places in the town and has published proposals to reduce them. The options involved school amalgamations and closures. A list of schools taking children of primary age is at primary schools in Dacorum.

Political representation
Hemel Hempstead returns its own MP at Westminster as the Hemel Hempstead parliamentary constituency.

In the 20 General Elections since the New Town was created, a Conservative MP has been returned 17 times and a Labour MP 3 times. The current MP is Sir Mike Penning, who was elected in the 2005 General Election.

Governance
Hemel Hempstead has two tiers of local government, at district and county level: Dacorum Borough Council and Hertfordshire County Council. There is no parish or town council in Hemel Hempstead, which has been an unparished area since 1974.

Historically, the parish of Hemel Hempstead was in the hundred of Dacorum. On 29 December 1539, Henry VIII granted the town a charter of incorporation under the title "the Bailiff and Inhabitants", making the town a bailiwick, which was given the right to hold a market, a fair and a court of piepowders.

In 1835 Hemel Hempstead became the centre of a poor law union, and a workhouse was built on Redbourn Road.

The town's status in having a bailiff and corporation was relatively unusual. It was sometimes described as a borough, but it was not counted as a borough for the purposes of the Municipal Corporations Act 1835, nor the Municipal Corporations Act 1883. As such, the old corporation did not become a municipal borough, and it did not assume the powers and responsibilities which were gradually given to municipal boroughs after 1835. Instead, local government functions passed to the board of guardians of the poor law union, which also became a rural sanitary district in 1872. The Local Government Act 1894 converted rural sanitary districts into rural districts and established elected parish councils. From December 1894, Hemel Hempstead therefore found itself governed by the Hemel Hempstead Rural District Council, Hemel Hempstead Parish Council, and the still-operating but largely powerless bailiff and corporation. One consequence of the town's anomalous status was that it had the last operating court of piepowders in England, with the final session held on 2 December 1897.

The town petitioned Queen Victoria to allow it to become a municipal borough, and a borough charter was granted on 8 June 1898. The old corporation and parish council were both dissolved, replaced by a new municipal borough council. The borough also became independent from the Hemel Hempstead Rural District. The first mayor of the borough was Sir Astley Paston Paston-Cooper of Gadebridge House.

For most of its existence, Hemel Hempstead Borough Council was based at the Town Hall on High Street, which had been built in 1851 for the old corporation. A new Town Hall was built for the borough council in 1966 on Marlowes, between the old town and the new town centre.

Hemel Hempstead Municipal Borough was abolished under the Local Government Act 1972, becoming part of the district of Dacorum (named after the ancient hundred which covered a similar area) on 1 April 1974. No successor parish was created for the town, and so it became an unparished area. Dacorum District Council used the 1966 Hemel Hempstead Town Hall on Marlowes as its headquarters, renaming it Dacorum Civic Centre. In recognition of Hemel Hempstead's former borough status, Dacorum district was awarded borough status on 10 October 1984.

Twinned towns
Hemel Hempstead, as part of the Borough of Dacorum, is twinned with:
 Neu-Isenburg, Germany

Notable features

Hemel is famous for its "Magic Roundabout" (officially called the "Plough Roundabout" from a former adjacent public house), an interchange at the end of the town centre (Moor End), where traffic from six routes meet. Traffic is able to circulate in both directions around what appears to be a main central roundabout (which it used to be), with the normal rules applying at each of the six mini-roundabouts encircling this central reservation. It was the first such circulation system in Britain.

Hemel claims to have the first purpose-built, free-standing multi-storey car park in Britain.

The new town centre is laid out alongside landscaped gardens and water features formed from the River Gade known as the Watergardens designed by G. A. Jellicoe. The Watergardens is home to many ducks, which have been known to cause major delays on the surrounding roads. The main shopping street, Marlowes, was pedestrianised in the early 1990s.

Hemel also was home of one of the first community-based television stations West Herts TV which later became Channel 10.

For many years the lower end of Marlowes featured a distinctive office building built as a bridge-like structure straddling the main road. This building was erected on the site of an earlier railway viaduct carrying the Hemel to Harpenden railway, known as the Nickey Line. When the new town was constructed, this part of the railway was no longer in use and the viaduct demolished. The Nickey Line is now used for walking. The office building, occupied by BP, was designed to create a similar skyline and effect as the viaduct. In the early 1980s it was discovered that the building was subsiding dangerously and it was vacated and demolished. Adjacent to BP buildings was a unique double-helix public car park. The lower end of Marlowes was redeveloped into the Riverside shopping complex, which opened on 27 October 2005. Retailers taking residence at the Riverside complex, include Debenhams and H&M (previously HMV).

A few metres away, overlooking the 'Magic Roundabout', is Hemel's tallest building; the 20-storey Kodak building, consisting of 18 office floors, two plantroom floors and a basement. It also had an annex building two storeys high, containing a restaurant, cinema and a gym. Built as the Kodak Company's UK HQ, the tower was vacated in 2005. It was then temporarily reoccupied in 2006 after the Buncefield explosion destroyed Kodak's other Hemel offices. It has since been converted into flats.

The Heathrow Airport holding area known as the Bovingdon stack lies just west of the town. On a clear day, at peak times, several circling aircraft can be visible in the sky.

The national headquarters of the Boys' Brigade is located at Felden Lodge, near Hemel.

The Dacorum Heritage Trust, a local history advocacy group, has proposals to convert the 18th-century house at The Bury into a museum and art gallery, to display a collection of archaeological and historical artefacts from the surrounding area. The project is currently awaiting necessary funding and planning permission to proceed.

Public art

The new town centre contains many sculptures by notable artists from the 1950s including a 1955 stone mural by sculptor Alfred Gerrard entitled Stages in the Development of Man. There is also the Rock & Rollers sculpture created by the French artist Hubert Yencess, which originally stood outside Bank Court but has been moved to the water gardens, and a fountain called Water Play.

A concrete and glass rainbow sculpture, Residents' Rainbow by Californian artist Colin Lambert, was installed on in the Marlowes in 1993, the ceramic rainbow tiling was replaced with glass mosaic by artist Gary Drostle in 2010. Nearby is a 3D map of 1940s Hemel. 
 
In 2008 an abstract stone sculpture by Timothy Shutter, entitled  A Point for Reflection, was unveiled outside the Riverside Shopping Centre.

A series of 33 ft high blue steel arches called the Phoenix Gateway has been installed on the roundabout closest to the Hemel Hempstead junction of the M1 motorway. The aim is to regenerate the town after the Buncefield fire with a striking piece of commercial art. It is funded by the East of England Development Agency.

Notable events 

In December 2005 there was a series of explosions and fires at Buncefield oil depot.
This was widely reported as the largest explosion in peacetime Europe by many media organisations, although verification of the claim is scant.

Notable people

Notable people associated with the town in order of birth date:
 Richard Field (1561–1616) a theologian associated with the founding of the Anglican Church, was born in Hemel Hempstead.
 Sir Francis Bacon (1561–1626) was Lord of the Manor of Gorhambury which included Hemel Hempstead from 1601.
 Robert Snooks (c. 1761–1802) England's last highwayman to be executed and buried at the scene of his crime lies here.
 Sir Astley Cooper (1768–1841) English surgeon and anatomist. Lived at Gadebridge House, the grounds of which are now a public park.
 Lefevre James Cranstone (1822–1893), artist known for his landscape paintings of Antebellum America was born here.
 John Dickinson (1782–1869), inventor and founder of the paper mills at Apsley, Nash Mills, and Croxley Green, to become John Dickinson & Co., built and lived at Abbots Wood, Nash Mills.
 Sir Arthur Evans, (1851–1941) archaeologist, was born at the "Red House", Nash Mills.
 William Heale (1859–1907), cricketer.
William John Locke (1863–1930), novelist, dramatist and playwright, best known for his short stories lived at Corner Hall in the 1900s.
 Lyn Harding (1867–1952) actor and film star lived at a house called Logandene in Tile Kiln Lane, Leverstock Green, Hemel Hempstead.
 Prince Maurice of Battenberg (1891–1914), grandson of Queen Victoria was a pupil at Lockers Park School.
 Loben Edward Harold Maund (1892–1957) was a rear admiral of the Royal Navy and captain of HMS Ark Royal at the time of her sinking in November 1941.
 Louis Mountbatten, 1st Earl Mountbatten of Burma (1900–1979), admiral, statesman and an uncle of the Duke of Edinburgh, was a pupil at Lockers Park School. The combined Corner Hall boys' and girls' school was named Mountbatten after him, and he visited the school for the opening. The school was located on what is now the Jarman Park site.
 Guy Burgess, (1911–1963), Russian spy, was a pupil at Lockers Park School.
 Ashley George Old, (1913–2001), an artist, spent many months in Hemel Hempstead in 1959 recording the changes as the New Town evolved.
 Salem Hanna Khamis (1919–2005), a Palestinian economic statistician for the United Nations Food and Agriculture Organisation who helped formalise the Geary-Khamis method of computing purchasing power parity of currencies. In later life he lived in Hemel Hempstead and died there.
 Roger Moore, (1927–2017) actor, famous for his roles as The Saint and James Bond, lived in Tile Kiln Close, Leverstock Green, Hemel Hempstead in the 1960s.
 Christopher Trace (1933–1992), first presenter of BBC TV's Blue Peter children's show, lived for a time in Blacksmiths Row, Leverstock Green.
 Michael Bradshaw (1933–2001) Anglo/Canadian actor who grew up in Boxmoor from 1938 until the mid-1950s
 James Purves (born 1937), cricketer
 Bill Morris, Baron Morris of Handsworth (born 1938), former leader of the TGWU, lived in Hemel Hempstead and still lives within the Borough of Dacorum.
 Malcolm Phipps (born 1942) Author, poet and 9th Dan International Karate Instructor lives in Hemel Hempstead.
 Paul Boateng, (born 1951) Britain's first black Cabinet minister and Ambassador to South Africa, attended Apsley Grammar School (now part of Longdean School). He first stood for Parliament in Hemel Hempstead's constituency.
 Dave Vanian (born 1956) (real name David Lett), the lead singer of the Damned, was born and lived in Chaulden.
 Magenta Devine (1957–2019), TV presenter, born Kim Taylor, was born in Hemel Hempstead.
 Ian Lygo (born c. 1958), civil servant, made 75 successful appearances on the UK game show 100% in late 1998.
 Dougie Brimson (born 1959), author and screenwriter, was born and lives in Hemel Hempstead.
 Ian Fantham (born 1964), former cricketer, was born in Hemel Hempstead.
 Chris Pig (born 1965), internationally respected master printmaker, lived in Hemel Hempstead and attended Longdean School.
 Claire Skinner (born 1965), actress was born and brought up in Hemel Hempstead.
 Steven Wilson, (born 1967) musician, singer, songwriter and record producer who lived here from the age of six after his family moved from London. His band Porcupine Tree was also formed in Hemel Hempstead around the year 1987. "No-Man's Land", Wilson's home studio in which he has recorded most of the body of his work, is located here.
 Caroline, Lady Dalmeny was born and brought up in Hemel Hempstead.
 Luke Donald, (born 1977) golfer, was born in Hemel Hempstead. 
 Anthony Davidson, (born 1979) Formula One driver was born here. 
 Tommy W. Smith, (born 1980), a footballer playing for Brentford in the Football League Championship was born in Hemel Hempstead.
 Frank Carter (born 27 April 1984) musician and tattoo artist who has been the vocalist of Gallows, Pure Love and Frank Carter & the Rattlesnakes.
 Talulah Riley (born 6 September 1985), actress and ex-wife of Elon Musk.
 Chris Eagles (born 1985), footballer for Blackpool in the Football League Championship is from Hemel Hempstead.
 Jordan Parkes (born 1989), an English footballer, playing for Hemel Hempstead Town, is from Leverstock Green.

 Max Whitlock (born 13 January 1993), member of Britain's gymnastics team at the 2012 Summer Olympics in London and double gold medalist at the 2016 Summer Olympics in Rio de Janeiro.
 Cauley Woodrow (born 2 December 1994), an English footballer playing for Barnsley.
 Harry Winks (born 2 February 1996), an English footballer playing for Tottenham Hotspur.
 Sheyi Ojo (born 19 June 1997), an English footballer playing for Cardiff City.

Film, television and entertainment

Film and television production
 Quatermass 2 used Hemel Hempstead, which was at the time under development, for the fictional new town of Winerton Flats.
 Softly Softly, an offshoot from Z Cars, used Shendish House as the headquarters.
 Pie in the Sky (BBC police drama) was filmed in Hemel. At one point, the site for the restaurant was a florists but is now a shop selling dolls' houses. A nearby restaurant changed its name to Pie in the Sky for a short time while the series was popular. The current shopfront and surrounding properties were also featured in the Midsomer Murders episode "The Sword of Guillaume".
 Birthday Girl (2001 film starring Nicole Kidman and Ben Chaplin) features Hemel Hempstead prominently during scenes showing the main character going to and from his place of work (a fictional bank somewhere in Bank Court). However, scenes shown in the parking garage and the side streets show St Albans.
 A film version of the TV series Till Death Us Do Part was filmed in part around the town.
 Episode three of the four-part detective series Endeavour (TV series), broadcast in February 2019, also features Hemel Hemptead old town high street at the end of the episode.
 David Walliams' Christmas programme Mr Stink was also filmed in Hemel, with much of Gadebridge Park being used.
After Life is a British black comedy-drama web television series created, executive produced, directed by, and starring Ricky Gervais. It premiered on 8 March 2019 on Netflix. Several scenes were filmed in Hemel Hempstead Old Town, including the use offices for the Tambury Gazette, a fictional local newspaper.

The Pavilion
The Pavilion was an iconic 1960s structure sited on the Marlowes just in front of the library. It was an entertainments venue that hosted emerging and internationally famous acts between the 1960s and 1990s.

Jazz artists included Kenny Ball and his Jazzmen, Count Basie, Oscar Peterson and Buddy Rich.

Rock and Pop acts included David Bowie, Eric Clapton, U2, Wishbone Ash, Talking Heads, Ian Dury, Genesis, Quintessence and Status Quo.

The venue was closed and the building demolished in 2002. According to local media reports, Dacorum Borough Council decided it was "becoming increasingly unsuitable to meet the leisure needs of the local community". A 'memorial service' was held on the tenth anniversary of its closure in 2012. The Forum, Hemel Hempstead's new council, library and voluntary services hub, opened its doors to the public on Monday 16 January and sits on the former Pavilion site.

Hemel Hempstead Theatre Company

Originally known as The Hemel Hempstead Operatic and Dramatic Society, the Hemel Hempstead Theatre Company has operated since 1925. Over the years the company performed in a number of locations, including the Luxor Cinemas in the Marlowes and St. John’s Hall at 72 St. John's Road, which had been built in 1930 as extension of the nearby St. John’s Church. The first-ever theatrical performance at St. John’s Hall was given by the Theatre Company in April 1932. Hemel Hempstead Theatre Company purchased the St. John's Hall building in 1997 and renamed it the Boxmoor Playhouse. Holding up to 200 seats, The Boxmoor Playhouse is said to be the largest theatre in Hemel Hempstead. Each year the Company produces a variety of productions from plays to musicals to pantomimes. Due to the flexibility of the space, the Company also holds social events such as quiz nights, creative workshops and cabaret evenings.

Art and photograph gallery

References

Further reading

 
  – Early description of the town at Hertfordshire Genealogy.
 
 
 
 
 
"How historic treasures have devalued a house", Sunday Times, 12 November 2000 by Chris Partridge; p. 15

External links

 Dacorum Borough Council Local authority pages on Hemel Hempstead.
 Pictures of Hemel in 1974
 Hemel on-line Hemel Hempstead community website.
 Photos of Hemel and surrounding area Indexed by OS grid square at www.geograph.co.uk
 Hemel Hempstead (Pictures and History) on A Guide to Old Hertfordshire
 A Brief History of Hemel Hempstead A Blog on Hemel Hempstead's local history.
 1961 documentary film about Hemel Hempstead by Pathé News
 The Snow Centre, Hemel Hempstead's indoor snow centre.

 
Towns in Hertfordshire
New towns in England
New towns started in the 1940s
Unparished areas in Hertfordshire
Former civil parishes in Hertfordshire
Dacorum